Stadionul Gheorghe Dincă is a multi-purpose stadium in Voluntari, Romania. It is currently used mostly for football matches, is the home ground of FC Voluntari II and holds 1,500 people. The stadium was the main arena based in Voluntari, until the building of Stadionul Anghel Iordănescu and was also the home ground of FC Voluntari, between 2010 and 2012.

References

External links
Stadionul Gheorghe Dincă at soccerway.com

Football venues in Romania
Sport in Ilfov County
Buildings and structures in Ilfov County